Charles William Paddock (August 11, 1900 – July 21, 1943) was an American athlete and two time Olympic champion.

Biography
Paddock was born in Gainesville, Texas to Charles H. and Lulu (Robinson) Paddock. His family moved to Pasadena, California when he was a child. After serving in World War I as a lieutenant of field artillery in the U.S. Marines, Paddock studied at the University of Southern California. There he became a member of the track and field team, and excelled in the sprint events. He won the 100 and 200 m in the first major sporting event after the war, the 1919 Inter-Allied Games, in which soldiers of the Allied nations competed against each other. Paddock was the first person named "The fastest man alive".

In 1920, Paddock represented his country at the 1920 Summer Olympics in Antwerp. In Belgium, he had his greatest successes, winning the 100 m final, while placing second in the 200 m event.  With the American 4 × 100 m relay team, Paddock won a third Olympic medal. Paddock became famous for his unusual finishing style, leaping towards the finish line at the end of the race.

The next year, he ran the 110 yd, which is slightly more than 100 m, in 10.2 seconds.  It was not until 1956 that the world record for the 100 m became lower than Paddock's time over 110 yd. Paddock broke or equaled several other world records over Imperial distances.

At the 1924 Olympics, Paddock again qualified for both the 100 and 200 m finals, but he was less successful than four years earlier; he finished 5th in the 100 m and won another silver medal in the 200 m.  Paddock was not a part of the relay team. In Chariots of Fire, the 1981 Oscar-winning film about those races, Paddock was portrayed by Dennis Christopher. In 1928, Paddock participated in his third Olympics, but did not reach the 200 m final.

During his athletic activities, Paddock also held management positions in several newspapers; his father-in-law was newspaper publisher Charles H. Prisk. In 1926, Paddock appeared in The Campus Flirt, a black-and-white silent film (now lost) featuring another Texas native, Paramount starlet Bebe Daniels. Paddock served on the personal staff of Major General William P. Upshur beginning at the end of World War I. An autobiography, entitled The Fastest Human, was published in 1932.

In 1943, during World War II, Upshur and Paddock (by then a captain) died in a plane crash near Sitka, Alaska. Paddock is interred at Sitka National Cemetery in Sitka.

In 1976 he was inducted into the National Track and Field Hall of Fame.

Competition record

References

External links
 

1900 births
1943 deaths
United States Marine Corps personnel of World War I
United States Marine Corps personnel killed in World War II
American male sprinters
Athletes (track and field) at the 1920 Summer Olympics
Athletes (track and field) at the 1924 Summer Olympics
Athletes (track and field) at the 1928 Summer Olympics
Olympic gold medalists for the United States in track and field
Olympic silver medalists for the United States in track and field
People from Gainesville, Texas
Pasadena High School (California) alumni
University of Southern California alumni
Accidental deaths in Alaska
Track and field athletes from California
Sportspeople from Texas
Sportspeople from Pasadena, California
American male film actors
Male actors from Texas
Male actors from Pasadena, California
20th-century American male actors
Medalists at the 1924 Summer Olympics
Medalists at the 1920 Summer Olympics
Burials at Sitka National Cemetery
Universiade medalists in athletics (track and field)
Universiade gold medalists for the United States
USA Outdoor Track and Field Championships winners
Victims of aviation accidents or incidents in 1943
Victims of aviation accidents or incidents in the United States
World record setters in athletics (track and field)
United States Marine Corps officers
Military personnel from California
Military personnel from Texas